Steve Zissis (born December 17, 1975)
is an American actor, writer and producer. A longtime friend of Jay and Mark Duplass, he has appeared in and co-produced some of their productions, including the films Baghead (2008), Cyrus (2010), The Do-Deca-Pentathlon (2012) and the TV series Togetherness (2015–2016). He has also appeared in other films and TV shows, including the 2013 film  Her.

Early life
Zissis was born on December 17, 1975 in New Orleans, Louisiana. He is of Greek descent. He attended the all-male Jesuit High School. Among his schoolmates were Mark Duplass and Jay Duplass; he knew both, although he was better acquainted with Mark, who was a year below him, than Jay, who was three years above him. Zissis was heavily into music and musical theater.

Career
Zissis made his film debut in the short film Climbing Out (2002). He went on to star in The Intervention, a short film directed by Jay Duplass and written by Mark Duplass. Zissis then went on to appear in the short film Momma's Boy. In 2008, Zissis had the leading role in the film Baghead which was written and directed by Mark Duplass and Jay Duplass, which had its world premiere at the Sundance Film Festival on January 22, 2008. At the festival it was acquired by Sony Pictures Classics, and was released on July 13, 2008. That same year, Zissis appeared in the short film Loveolution, and made his television debut in The Office.

In 2009, Zissis appeared in The Overbook Brothers which had its world premiere at South by Southwest. That same year, Zissis appeared in Sunday Morning,
The League, and Prototype. In 2010, Zissis appeared in Cyrus. Zissis appeared in two episodes of Parks and Recreation. That same year Zissis wrote, directed, produced and edited the short film Kleshnov. In 2011, Zissis appeared in Jeff, Who Lives at Home, which was written by Mark Duplass and Jay Duplass. The film had its world premiere at the Toronto International Film Festival on September 14, 2011.

In 2012, Zissis starred in the leading role of The Do-Deca-Pentathlon which was also written by Mark and Jay Duplass, who also directed the film, which premiered at South by Southwest in March 2012. The film was released on June 26, 2012, through video on demand prior to a limited release on June 26, 2012. In 2013, Zissis voiced the role of Milo in Bad Milo, which premiered at South by Southwest in March 2013, and was released in August 2013. That same year, he also appeared in Spike Jonze's Her.

Together with the Duplass brothers, Zissis created the HBO TV series Togetherness; Zissis also starred in the series as the best friend of Mark Duplass's character. The series premiered on January 11, 2015, and ran for two seasons.

Filmography

Film

Television

References

External links
 

1975 births
21st-century American male actors
Male actors from New Orleans
American male film actors
Living people
American male television actors
American male voice actors
American people of Greek descent